Anandpur may refer to the following topics in India:

 Anandpur Bhadla (Gujarati: આણંદપુર ભાડલા), a village in Chotila Taluka of Surendranagar district, Gujarat, India
 Anandpur State, a former princely state with seat in the above Gujarati town
 Anandpur Kalu, a village in Jaitaran tehsil of Pali district in Rajasthan
 Anandpur Sahib, Holy Sikh city in Punjab, India
 Anandpur Sahib (Lok Sabha constituency)
 First Battle of Anandpur in 1700, between the armies of the Sikh Guru Gobind Singh and the Mughal forces aided by the Rajas of the Sivalik Hills
 Second Battle of Anandpur in 1704, between Sikhs and the allied Rajas of the Sivalik Hills
 Anandpur Sahib Resolution, a statement made by a Sikh political party, the Shiromani Akali Dal, in 1973
 Anandpur, Vikramgad, a village in the Palghar district of Maharashtra, India, in the Vikramgad taluka

See also 
 Anandapur (disambiguation)
 Anandapuram, Andhra Pradesh, India